Ya'akov "Yankale" Shahar (born 1941) is an Israeli businessman best known for his ownership of Maccabi Haifa F.C.

References

Israeli Jews
Maccabi Haifa F.C.
Israeli football chairmen and investors
1941 births
Living people
People from Ness Ziona